Bobovik is a village in Serbia. It is located in the municipality of Vladimirci, in the Mačva District. The population numbered 307 people in a 2002 census.

Populated places in Mačva District